Eois plicata is a moth in the  family Geometridae. It is found in India.

References

Moths described in 1888
Eois
Moths of Asia